Gheorghe Ene (born February 13, 1959), known as Ionică Minune, is a Romani-Romanian accordionist.

Life and career
Ionică Minune was born in Costeşti, Buzău County, Romania into a family of lăutari. The members of his family played different instruments and they used to be booked together as one taraf (band) at various events in the village. At the age of four, Ionică took his older brother accordion and played a waltz by ear without any kind of training. Since then he continued to play and practice, mostly for his own pleasure, as he didn't want to become a professional musician.

As a teenager, Ionică dreamed to become a policeman, but, when his father became ill, he started to play professionally in order to help his family. He quickly became an acclaimed accordionist and before he turned twenty he played only with several major figures of the lăutareasca music. Since 1979, he also started to tour abroad in countries such as: Italy, France, Spain, Germany, Japan and Malaysia.

In the early 1990s he moved to France. There, besides lăutareasca music, he started to play jazz, manouche jazz, as well as other kinds of music.  Despite living a good life (he received French citizenship and an apartment) he did not feel very comfortable in France and returned to Romania in 2006. There, he started an accordion school together with the accordionist Constantin "Fulgerică" and the cimbalom player Cristinel Turturică (a former member of Taraf de Haïdouks).

Throughout his career, besides many great lăutari, Ionică Minune played with artists such as Bobby McFerrin, Oscar Peterson, Michel Petrucciani, Richard Galliano, Marcel Azzola, Didier Lockwood, Tschavolo Schmitt and Florin Niculescu.

References

Sources
 Interview with Ionică Minune 
 Ionică, the wonder accordionist
 Kings of the accordion
 Bobby McFerrin vs. accordion and cimbalom

1959 births
Living people
Romanian accordionists
Romani musicians
Romanian Romani people
Lăutari and lăutărească music
21st-century accordionists